Ervin Frank "Four Sack" Dusak (July 29, 1920 – November 6, 1994) was an American professional baseball outfielder, infielder and pitcher in Major League Baseball over nine seasons spanning 1941 to 1952 for the St. Louis Cardinals and Pittsburgh Pirates.

Dusak signed with the Cardinals' organization in 1938 and got his nickname from a poem a fan wrote after he hit a home run in the minors. He spent the 1941 season among three Cardinal farm clubs: the Class B Mobile Shippers, Class A1 Houston Buffaloes (who won 103 games), and the top-level Rochester Red Wings, batting a composite .318 with 23 long balls.

On July 7, 1946, he hit a game-winning, three-run home run to beat the Brooklyn Dodgers and to move his club within a half game of the National League lead. Brooklyn and St. Louis would finish the 1946 regular-season in a dead heat, forcing a tie-breaker series that delivered the Cardinals' ninth pennant since 1926. Dusak played a key role in the clinching second game of the series, hitting a triple and an RBI single to help propel the Redbirds to the 8–4 triumph. They went on to win the World Series, with Dusak appearing in four Fall Classic games, getting four at bats, and hitting a double in Game 2.

When his batting average dropped, he turned to pitching, appearing in 23 games, all in relief, but ended his career primarily as a position player with the Pittsburgh Pirates. In 413 MLB games played over all or part of nine major-league seasons, Dusak batted .243; his 251 hits included 32 doubles, six triples and 24 homers, with 106 RBI. He drew walks well, with a lifetime .334 on-base percentage that was 91 points higher than his batting average. On the mound, he posted an 0–3 won–lost record and 5.33 earned run average; in 54 innings pitched, he allowed 51 hits and 44 walks, with 26 strikeouts.

After retiring in 1952, Dusak was an insurance agent for 21 years and worked in a bowling alley for a decade. He died in Glendale Heights, Illinois, aged 74.

References

External links

 

1920 births
1994 deaths
Albany Cardinals players
American people of Czech descent
Baseball players from Chicago
Farragut Career Academy alumni
Hollywood Stars players
Houston Buffaloes players
Major League Baseball outfielders
Major League Baseball pitchers
Major League Baseball second basemen
Major League Baseball third basemen
Mobile Shippers players
Monett Red Birds
New Orleans Pelicans (baseball) players
Pittsburgh Pirates players
Rochester Red Wings players
St. Louis Cardinals players
United States Army personnel of World War II